The 1936 World Table Tennis Championships men's doubles was the tenth edition of the men's doubles championship.
Jimmy McClure and Buddy Blattner defeated Stanislav Kolář and Okter Petrisek in the final by three sets to nil.

Results

See also
List of World Table Tennis Championships medalists

References

-